Jean Perron (born October 5, 1946) is a Canadian ice hockey coach and sports commentator, best known for being the 16th head coach of the Montreal Canadiens, serving from 1985 to 1988.  Perron has more recently served as the head coach for Israel's men's national teams.

Coaching career
Born in Saint-Isidore-d'Auckland, Quebec, Perron was an assistant coach with the National Hockey League's Montreal Canadiens under Jacques Lemaire for one season before being named head coach in 1985.  As a rookie head coach, Perron won a Stanley Cup with the Canadiens.  Perron would spend three seasons as the Canadiens' head coach before resigning after the 1987–88 season. The next year, he was hired by the Quebec Nordiques as a temporary midseason replacement.  He also served as an assistant coach for Canada at the 1987 Canada Cup.  Later, Perron joined the International Hockey League's San Francisco Spiders as their head coach and general manager for one season, followed by a short stint with the Manitoba Moose.

Perron's tough and often authoritarian coaching style resulted in tumultuous relationships with several of his players and staff, including a long-standing public feud with former Canadiens player Chris Nilan.

Post career
After his professional coaching career, Perron became a hockey analyst for different media outlets in Quebec and has appeared regularly on TQS's sports talk show 110%. He was often mocked for his incorrect use of proverbs and idioms and a book, Les Perronismes supposedly listing his most famous linguistic faux-pas was published in 2001.

In 2004, Perron was named the coach of the Israel's Under-18 and senior men's national teams.  He led both teams to new heights with Israel being promoted to Division I for one year.  He left after two seasons but returned in 2011 and led the Under-18 team to an IIHF World U-18 Division II Group B championship in 2013.

Coaching record

NHL

References

External links 

Montreal Canadiens profile

1946 births
Living people
Canadian ice hockey coaches
French Quebecers
International Hockey League (1945–2001) head coaches
Israel men's national ice hockey team coaches
Manitoba Moose coaches
Montreal Canadiens coaches
National Hockey League broadcasters
People from Estrie
Quebec Nordiques announcers
Quebec Nordiques coaches
Stanley Cup champions
Stanley Cup championship-winning head coaches